The Last Chapter is a compilation album by the reggaeton duo R.K.M & Ken-Y. It includes two previously unreleased tracks including the hit "Te Amé En Mis Sueños" and "Por Amor a Ti". This album was released after five years of the career of R.K.M. & Ken-Y on March 30, 2010. The album reached #11 on the Billboard Top Latin Albums chart.

Track listing
 Te Amé En Mis Sueños - 4:20
 Por Amor a Ti - 3:39
 Igual Que Ayer - 2:55
 Mi Amor Es Pobre (feat. Tony Dize) - 4:01
 Me Matas - 3:16
 Dame Lo Que Quiero - 3:35
 Un Sueño - 4:05
 Y Tú No Estás - 3:17
 Llorarás - 4:01
 Down (Remix) (feat. Hector El Father) - 3:47
 Te Regalo Amores - 3:59
 Cuerpo Sensual (feat. Don Omar) - 3:39
 Vicio del Pecado (feat. Héctor Acosta "El Torito") - 3:57
 Cruz y Maldición - 4:05
 Oh Oh, ¿Por Qué Te Están Velando? - 3:16
 Mis Dias Sin Ti - 3:55

References

External links
 http://www.rakimandkeny.com/

2010 compilation albums
R.K.M & Ken-Y albums
Pina Records compilation albums